The Arrohattoc, also occasionally spelled Arrohateck, was a Native American tribe from Henrico County, Virginia in the United States. The tribe was led by their chief Ashuaquid and was part of the Powhatan Confederacy. Their main village was located on the James River, the location of which is now the site of Henrico, Virginia.

In 1607 the tribe came into contact with Christopher Newport and John Smith, who were exploring the area with a small group of men associated with the Virginia Company of London. The group was given a warm welcome by the Arrohattocs, a reception that they enjoyed when they continued up the James River and arrived at another village, which was ruled over by Powhatan's son Parahunt. The tribe would also continue to help the settlers when their fort was attacked by hostile Indians later that same year.

However, as time progressed relations between the Arrohattocs and English colonists deteriorated and by 1609 the tribe was unwilling to trade with the settlers. As the population began to dwindle, the tribe declined and was last mentioned in a 1610 report by the visiting William Strachey and by 1611 the tribe's Henrico town was found to be deserted when Sir Thomas Dale went to use the land to found Henricus.

See also
History of Richmond, Virginia - further details

References

External links
 Media: Indian Town of Arrohateck at Encyclopedia Virginia

Algonquian peoples
Powhatan Confederacy
Native American tribes in Virginia
Henrico County, Virginia